The 1999 Brickyard 400, the 6th running of the event, was a NASCAR Winston Cup Series race held on August 7, 1999 at Indianapolis Motor Speedway in Speedway, Indiana. Contested at 160 laps on the 2.5 mile (4.023 km) speedway, it was the 20th race of the 1999 NASCAR Winston Cup Series season. Dale Jarrett of Robert Yates Racing won the race.

Background
The Indianapolis Motor Speedway, located in Speedway, Indiana, (an enclave suburb of Indianapolis) in the United States, is the home of the Indianapolis 500 and the Brickyard 400. The track's turns are banked at 9 degrees, while the front stretch, the location of the finish line, has no banking. The back stretch, opposite of the front, also has a zero degree banking. The racetrack has seats for more than 250,000 spectators. Jeff Gordon was the race's defending champion.

Summary
Late in the race, Dale Jarrett leads, but fourth-place Bobby Labonte is the only car in the top five that can go the distance without pitting for fuel. A caution comes out with 17 laps to go, allowing the leaders to pit, foiling Labonte's chances to steal the win. As the leaders pitted, in an unexpected move, Dale Jarrett took on only two tires. Jeff Burton saw this and pulled away after taking only two tires. His pit crew, however, had already tried to loosen the lug nuts on the left side. Jarrett led the rest of the way, becomes the second two-time winner, and erases his heartbreak from 1998.

Top 10 results

Race statistics
 Time of race: 2:41:57
 Average Speed: 
 Pole Speed: 179.612
 Cautions: 3 for 12 laps
 Margin of Victory: 3.351 sec
 Lead changes: 13
 Percent of race run under caution: 7.5%         
 Average green flag run: 37 laps

References

Brickyard 400
Brickyard 400
NASCAR races at Indianapolis Motor Speedway